The 1979 Tasmanian state election was held on 18 July 1979.

Retiring Members

Labor
Ray Sherry MHA (Franklin)

Liberal
Bill Beattie MHA (Bass)

House of Assembly
Sitting members are shown in bold text. Tickets that elected at least one MHA are highlighted in the relevant colour. Successful candidates are indicated by an asterisk (*).

Bass
Seven seats were up for election. The Labor Party was defending three seats. The Liberal Party was defending four seats.

Braddon
Seven seats were up for election. The Labor Party was defending four seats. The Liberal Party was defending three seats.

Denison
Seven seats were up for election. The Labor Party was defending three seats. The Liberal Party was defending four seats.

Franklin
Seven seats were up for election. The Labor Party was defending four seats. The Liberal Party was defending three seats.

Wilmot
Seven seats were up for election. The Labor Party was defending four seats. The Liberal Party was defending three seats.

See also
 Members of the Tasmanian House of Assembly, 1976–1979
 Members of the Tasmanian House of Assembly, 1979–1982

References
Tasmanian Parliamentary Library

Candidates for Tasmanian state elections